Martim Mércio da Silveira (2 March 1911 - 26 May 1972), in Argentina better known as Martín Mercío Silveyra, was a Brazilian football player. He played for Brazil national team at the 1934 and 1938 World Cup finals.

He commenced his career in 1929 with Guarany FC of Bagé in the state of Rio Grande do Sul. In October 1929 he moved on to Rio de Janeiro where he joined Botafogo FC where he won the Championships of Rio of the same year and 1932. From February to December 1933 he played for CA Boca Juniors in the  Argentine capital Buenos Aires, where he was the first Brazilian in the club's history. After this he returned to Botafogo winning 1934 and 1935 two more city Championships, albeit in the amateur orientated league in the then divided football of Rio. He stayed with Botafogo until the end of his career in 1940.

After his death he was laid  to rest on 27 May 1972 in the Cemitério de São João Batista in Botafogo, Rio de Janeiro.

References
 Martim Mércio da Silveyra, La Historia de Boca Juniors (per 12/9/2019)
 Martim Silveira: craque dono do meio-campo, Mundo Botafogo (per 12/9/2019)

1911 births
1972 deaths
Brazilian footballers
Brazilian expatriate footballers
Brazil international footballers
Guarany Futebol Clube players
Botafogo de Futebol e Regatas players
Boca Juniors footballers
Argentine Primera División players
Expatriate footballers in Argentina
1934 FIFA World Cup players
1938 FIFA World Cup players
Brazilian football managers
Botafogo de Futebol e Regatas managers
People from Bagé
Association football midfielders
Sportspeople from Rio Grande do Sul